Banks Broadcasting was a minority-owned broadcasting company which owned two television stations in the western United States. 50% of the company was owned by LIN TV, a large group broadcaster with clusters in the Northeast and Midwest and scattered stations elsewhere.

The President and CEO of Banks Broadcasting was Lyle Banks, who has formerly served as General Manager of WMAQ-TV, the NBC affiliate in Chicago. Banks Broadcasting was based in Winnetka, Illinois.

Banks Broadcasting was the owner of former WB Network and current CW affiliate KSCW-TV in Wichita, Kansas from its launch in 1999 (as KWCV) until July 20, 2007, when it was officially sold to Schurz Communications, the owner of that market's CBS affiliate KWCH-TV.

On July 1, 2008, Banks Broadcasting agreed to sell Boise's CW and former UPN station KNIN-TV to Journal Broadcast Group, owner of KIVI, which would have created Boise's first television duopoly group.   The FCC initially denied Journal the "failing station waiver" which was required for this purchase. However, on January 19, 2009, the FCC reversed its earlier decision to reject the sale, which was finalized on April 24, 2009. KNIN officially switched its network affiliation to Fox on September 1, 2011.

Companies based in Cook County, Illinois
Defunct television broadcasting companies of the United States
Defunct companies based in Illinois